One Tree Hill and Bitchet Common is a  biological Site of Special Scientific Interest east of Sevenoaks in Kent. It is in Kent Downs Area of Outstanding Natural Beauty and One Tree Hill is managed by the National Trust

This site has mixed woodland on the Lower Greensand, some of it of ancient origin. The habitats are varied, including acidic soils on Bitchet Common and damp, base-rich soils in Martins Wood. There are several rare plants and invertebrates.

The site is in several blocks crossed by public footpaths.

References

Sites of Special Scientific Interest in Kent